Azur & Asmar: The Princes' Quest is a 2006 French-Spanish-Belgian-Italian computer-animated fairytale fantasy film written and directed by Michel Ocelot and animated at the Paris animation and visual effects studio Mac Guff Ligne. It was released in theaters in North America as just Azur & Asmar.

It is Ocelot's fourth feature, though his first wholly original creation since Kirikou and the Sorceress, and his first use of 3D computer graphics, albeit an atypical employment of this medium with two-dimensional, painted backgrounds and non-photorealistic rendering. Like most of his films it is an original fairy tale, in this case inspired by the folklore (such as the One Thousand and One Nights) and decorative art of Morocco  and with an increased degree of characterisation relative to his previous works which pushes it into the genre of fairytale fantasy.

The original-language version of the film has significant amounts of dialogue in both French and Classical Arabic; however, the Arabic was not subtitled in the original French theatrical release and is not intended to be subtitled nor replaced for any other audiences.

Plot

Once upon a time there were two children nursed by Jénane: Azur, a blond, blue-eyed son of a nobleman, and Asmar, the tan skinned and dark-eyed child of Jénane. The nurse tells them the story of the Djinn-fairy waiting to be freed from her prison by a good and heroic prince. Brought up together, the two boys are as close as brothers until the day Azur's father cruelly separates them, banishing his nurse and Asmar from his home and sending Azur away to receive schooling from a personal tutor. Years later, Azur is haunted by memories of the legendary Djinn-fairy, and takes it upon himself to journey all the way to Asmar's homeland to seek her out and marry her. Now reunited, he finds that Jénane has since become a successful and rich merchant, while Asmar is now a member of the Royal Guard. However, Asmar and Azur's separation has damaged their bond and Asmar also longs to find and marry the Djinn-fairy. They must learn to work together and get along again, but only one of the two princes can be successful in his quest.

Cast

Production
Ocelot describes the visual style of Azur & Asmar, as distinct from his earlier works, as being influenced by French art and Early Netherlandish painting of the 15th century (in particular, Jean Fouquet, the Limbourg brothers and Jan van Eyck), Persian miniatures and Islamic civilization from the Middle Ages until the 15th century and 16th century Safavid art.

Release 

Azur & Asmar premièred on 21 May 2006 as part of the Directors' Fortnight of the 2006 Cannes Film Festival and was released to French theatres nationwide on 25 October 2006.

An English-subtitled version was shown at numerous film festivals including the Montreal Film Festival for Children and Sprockets Toronto International Film Festival for Children – in both cases winning the festival's audience award. At the World Festival of Animated Film Zagreb - Animafest Zagreb the film won the Grand Prix - best feature film award in 2007.

The film was subsequently dubbed into English and distributed in the United Kingdom and Ireland by Soda Pictures (now known as Thunderbird Releasing) under the expanded title Azur & Asmar: The Princes' Quest, receiving a limited release which began on 8 February 2008 and lasted several months, most likely due to the small number of dubbed prints made (as of 27 June 2008, it was still showing at one cinema in Cleethorpes). It was rated U by the British Board of Film Classification for "mild fantasy violence"

North America 

The film was licensed for distribution in the United States by the Weinstein Company on 13 February 2007, during European Film Market at the Berlin International Film Festival. However, as of September 2008 – over a year later – no plans to release the film in the United States had been announced. Similarly, Seville Pictures announced that they would distribute the film to both English and French speakers in Canada, but as September 2008 they have only released a DVD with only the original French dialogue and no English subtitles. Some commentators had theorised that a United States release would be impossible due to Jénane's nipples being visible during a breastfeeding scene early in the film (Kirikou and the Sorceress went unrated to avoid the PG-13 or higher rating it would have received from the Motion Picture Association of America despite the similarly non-sexual nature of the nudity in that film) and the director's refusal to allow his films to be distributed in a censored version; the Weinsteins' apparent dropping of the title seemed attributable to this. However, in early September 2008 it was revealed to have been submitted to the MPAA by Genius Products (a home media distributor then co-owned the Weinstein Company) and received only a PG rating for "thematic material, some mild action and peril," with no explicit reference made to the nudity.

The British-dubbed version had its American première at IFC Center in New York City on 17 October 2008, and was distributed in theatres by GKIDS in collaboration with the Weinstein Company and under the shorter title of just Azur & Asmar. It was originally planned to run for one week in New York, before touring to other cities. However, due to the success of the first week (all screenings were sold out) its residency was extended for a second week of screenings. When these too sold out, a "third and final" week was announced. Cities it had toured to included Chicago, Columbus, Tucson, Hartford, Seattle, and Washington, D.C. The film screened at the San Joaquin Children's Film Festival, in Stockton, California from January 16 to 18, 2009.

Home media 

In the United Kingdom and Ireland, Soda Pictures followed their theatrical release with a region 2 DVD-Video release on 28 July 2008. Unlike the theatrical release, this DVD includes the French- and Arabic-language version with English subtitles for the French as well as the English dub.

The Japanese region 2 DVD and region A Blu-ray Disc was released on 19 December 2007, the South Korean region 3 DVD released on 17 July 2008 and all regional Blu-ray Discs released on January 29, 2014 all include English subtitles.

As of February 2019, the film is not available in high definition with English subtitles or the English dub on Blu-ray Disc, download or streaming in the United Kingdom, Ireland or United States. However, it can be seen with English subtitles with either of the Japanese or South Korean Blu-ray Disc releases.

Soundtrack
Music is by Lebanese-born composer Gabriel Yared with the exception of one short song composed and performed by Afida Tahri; Souad Massi contributes vocals and lyrics to the Yared-composed ending theme "." The score was nominated for the César Award for Best Music Written for a Film at the César Awards 2007.

References

External links
 Azur & Asmar official United States webpage with dates and locations for nationwide tour
 Azur & Asmar: The Princes' Quest official United Kingdom and Ireland website
 Azur et Asmar at Le Palais des dessins animés
 Financial Times and GhibliWorld.com interviews
 Production sketches, stills and original trailer
 
 
 

2000s children's fantasy films
2000s French animated films
2006 computer-animated films
2006 films
Animated films about friendship
2000s Arabic-language films
Belgian animated films
Belgian animated fantasy films
2000s fantasy adventure films
Films directed by Michel Ocelot
Films scored by Gabriel Yared
Films set in Africa
Films set in the Middle Ages
French animated fantasy films
2000s French-language films
Italian animated fantasy films
Italian animated films
Spanish animated fantasy films
Belgian fantasy adventure films
French fantasy adventure films
Italian fantasy adventure films
Spanish fantasy adventure films
2006 multilingual films
Belgian multilingual films
French multilingual films
Italian multilingual films
Spanish multilingual films
French-language Belgian films